WHBN (1420 AM) is a radio station broadcasting a country music format. Licensed to Harrodsburg, Kentucky, United States, it is currently owned by Hometown Broadcasting of Harrodsburg Inc and carriess programming from AP Radio and Jones Radio Networks.

Programming
WHBN features the longtime on-air personality "Radio Rick" Schoebel from 6 to 10am Monday to Friday and "The WildMan" Jason Wilder on Saturdays and Sundays from 7am to 12pm. WHBN also broadcasts live coverage of local school sporting and other events in and around Mercer County.

References

External links
 Official website
 

HBN
HBN
Radio stations established in 1955
1955 establishments in Kentucky
Harrodsburg, Kentucky